Polyne Quarry is a 0.1 hectare Site of Special Scientific Interest (SSSI) in Cornwall, England, UK. It is located to the north of Polperro civil parish,  to the west of Looe.

The SSSI was designated in 1988 for its geological interest.

References

External links
 English Nature website (SSSI information)

Sites of Special Scientific Interest in Cornwall
Sites of Special Scientific Interest notified in 1988
Geology of Cornwall
Quarries in Cornwall
Polperro